The Ministry of Youth Affairs and Sports is a branch of the Government of India which administers the Department of Youth Affairs and the Department of Sports in India. Anurag Thakur is the current Minister of Youth Affairs and Sports followed by his Deputy Nisith Pramanik.

The ministry also gives the annual National Youth Awards, National Sports awards in various categories, including the Arjuna Award and Major Dhyan Chand Khel Ratna awards.

History
The ministry was set up as the Department of Sports at the time of organisation of 1982 Asian Games New Delhi. Its name was changed to the Department of Youth Affairs & Sports during celebration of the International Youth Year, 1985. It became a separate Ministry on 27 May 2000. Subsequently, In 2008, the ministry has been bifurcated into Department of Youth Affairs and Department of Sports under two separate Secretaries.

Department of Youth Affairs
Unlike the sports department, many of the functions of the department are related to other ministries, like Ministry of Education, Employment & Training, Health and Family Welfare thus it functions largely as a facilitator for youth building.

Definition of Youth
The United Nations defines "Youth" as 15–24 years and in the Commonwealth, it is 15–29 years. In order to use a definition more in line with these international standards, the Draft NYP 2012 changes the definition from 13–35 years to 16–30 years. The draft NYP 2012 plans to divide the age bracket of 16–30 years into three groups.

Organisations
 Nehru Yuva Kendra Sanghatan
Rajiv Gandhi National Institute of Youth Development

Programmes 
 Rashtriya Yuva Sashaktikaran Karyakram: Merge of schemes (National Youth Corps, Youth Hostels etc.)
 National Programme for Youth and Adolescent Development (NPYAD): introduced 2008-09
 National Service Scheme (NSS)
 National Youth Corps
International Youth Exchange Program
 National Youth Festival
 Urban Sports Infrastructure Scheme (USIS): a pilot project in 2010–11 to provide funding for infrastructure and improvements
 Panchayat Yuva Krida Aur Khel Abhiyan
 Promotion of Scouting & Guiding: The national headquarters of The Bharat Scouts and Guides (BSG), Hindustan scout and guide(HSG) and The scout guide organization (SGO) are recognised by the Government of India as the apex body in the field of Scouting and Guiding in India.
 Youth Hostels

Awards 

 National Young Leaders Awards (NYLA)
 Tenzing Norgay National Adventure Award
 National Youth Awards
 National Service Scheme (NSS) Awards
 Awards to Outstanding Youth Clubs (NYKS)

Department of Sports
The Department of Sports is a division of Ministry of Youth Affairs and Sports under Government of India created on 30 April 2008. They also helped in bringing the FIFA U-17 World cup to India. A huge part of it was played by the advisors to the Sports Ministry - Rahul Rana (Doon School) and Arjun Dewan (The Lawrence School).

Organisations
 Sports Authority of India
 National Sports University
 National Anti Doping Agency (NADA)
 Lakshmibai National Institute of Physical Education
 National Dope Testing Laboratory (NDTL)
  
Lakshmibai National College of Physical Education (LNCPE)

Netaji Subhash National institute of Sports (NSNIS)

Awards 

 Dronacharya Award
 Arjuna Award
 Dhyan Chand Award
 Major Dhyan Chand Khel Ratna
 Rashtriya Khel Protsahan Puruskar
 Maulana Abul Kalam Azad Trophy

Ministers of Youth Affairs and Sports

List of Ministers of State

See also
 Ministry of Sports
 Sport in India - overview of Sports 
 Various national level sport governing bodies in India 
 India at the Olympics

References

External links
 

 
Youth Affairs and Sports
Sports organisations of India
India, Youth Affairs and Sports
India, Youth Affairs and Sports
Youth sport in India
1982 establishments in India
Government agencies established in 1982